Hallgeir Grøntvedt (born 30 December 1959) is a Norwegian politician for the Centre Party.

He served as a deputy representative to the Parliament of Norway from Sør-Trøndelag during the terms 2009–2013 and 2013–2017.

He was elected to Ørland municipal council in 1987, and has served as mayor from 1997 to 1999 and 2003 to 2015. From 2003 to 2007 he was also a member of Sør-Trøndelag county council.

References

1959 births
Living people
People from Ørland
Deputy members of the Storting
Centre Party (Norway) politicians
Mayors of places in Sør-Trøndelag